The St. Albert Steel were an ice hockey team in the Alberta Junior Hockey League (AJHL).  They played in St. Albert, Alberta, Canada at Servus Place with a seating capacity of 2,044. The team relocated to Whitecourt in the 2012 off-season to become the Whitecourt Wolverines.

Founded: 2007-08
Relocated: 2012
Division titles won: None
Regular season titles won: None
League Championships won: None
Doyle Cup Titles: None
Royal Bank Cup Titles: None

History 
The Steel, relocated in 2007 from nearby Fort Saskatchewan where they were known as the Fort Saskatchewan Traders, were the second team to represent the City of St. Albert. The first team to represent the city was the St. Albert Saints, who relocated to Spruce Grove in 2004 to become the Spruce Grove Saints.

On March 29, 2012, it was announced the team applied to relocate to Whitecourt for the 2012-13 season. On May 3, 2012, the AJHL announced that it approved the relocation of the Steel to Whitecourt to become the Whitecourt Wolverines, taking their name from the simultaneously disbanded junior "B" Whitecourt Wolverines of the North West Junior Hockey League.

Season-by-season record 
Note: GP = Games played, W = Wins, L = Losses, T/OTL = Ties/Overtime losses, SOL = Shootout losses, Pts = Points, GF = Goals for, GA = Goals against

Playoffs 
2008 Lost Preliminary
Grande Prairie Storm defeated St. Albert Steel 3-games-to-2
2009 Lost Preliminary
Sherwood Park Crusaders defeated St. Albert Steel 3-games-to-1
2010 Lost Preliminary
Fort McMurray Oil Barons defeated St. Albert Steel 3-games-to-none
2011 Lost Preliminary
Fort McMurray Oil Barons defeated St. Albert Steel 3-games-to-none

See also
List of ice hockey teams in Alberta

References

2007 establishments in Alberta
2012 disestablishments in Alberta
Defunct Alberta Junior Hockey League teams
Defunct junior ice hockey teams in Canada
Ice hockey clubs established in 2007
Ice hockey clubs disestablished in 2012
Sport in St. Albert, Alberta